Phylace or Phylake (Phylakē) was a town of ancient Arcadia, upon the frontiers of Tegea and Laconia, where the Alpheius rises.

Its site is located west of the modern Vourvoura.

References

Populated places in ancient Arcadia
Former populated places in Greece